The 28th Golden Bell Awards was held on 20 March 1993 at the Sun Yat-sen Memorial Hall in Taipei, Taiwan. The ceremony was broadcast by Taiwan Television (TTV). For the first time, the Golden Bell Awards added the "Walk of Fame" segment. Radio Broadcasting Awards were awarded the next year.''

Winners

References

1993
1993 in Taiwan